The canton of L'Ouest agenais is an administrative division of the Lot-et-Garonne department, southwestern France. It was created at the French canton reorganisation which came into effect in March 2015. Its seat is in Colayrac-Saint-Cirq.

It consists of the following communes:
 
Aubiac
Brax
Colayrac-Saint-Cirq
Estillac
Laplume
Marmont-Pachas
Moirax
Roquefort
Sainte-Colombe-en-Bruilhois
Saint-Hilaire-de-Lusignan
Sérignac-sur-Garonne

References

Cantons of Lot-et-Garonne